Norbert Becker may refer to:

Norbert Becker (agroscientist) (1937–2012), German agroscientist
Norbert Becker (biologist) (born 1949), German biologist